The 1976–77 Sussex County Football League season was the 52nd in the history of Sussex County Football League a football competition in England.

Division One

Division One featured 13 clubs which competed in the division last season, along with three new clubs:
Eastbourne Town, transferred from the Athenian League
Peacehaven & Telscombe, promoted from Division Two
Selsey, promoted from Division Two

League table

Division Two

Division Two featured eleven clubs which competed in the division last season, along with three new clubs:
Arundel, relegated from Division One
Newhaven, relegated from Division One
Storrington, joined from the West Sussex League

Also, Hastings & St Leonards changed name to Hastings Town.

League table

References

1976-77
1976–77 in English football leagues